Proprioseiopsis grovesae is a species of mite in the family Phytoseiidae.

References

grovesae
Articles created by Qbugbot
Animals described in 1959